The South African Railways Class  of 1974 is a diesel-electric locomotive.

Between December 1974 and July 1976, the South African Railways placed one hundred Class  General Motors Electro-Motive Division type GT26MC diesel-electric locomotives in service.

Manufacturer
The Class  type GT26MC diesel-electric locomotive was designed by General Motors Electro-Motive Division and built for the South African Railways (SAR) by General Motors South Africa (GMSA) in Port Elizabeth.

Distinguishing features

Of the GM-EMD Class 34 family of locomotives, Classes  and  units are visually indistinguishable from one another, but they can be distinguished from the Class  by the thicker fishbelly shaped sills on their left hand sides compared to the straight sill on the left hand side of the Class .

Rebuilding and modification

Class 39-000
The Class 39-000 type GT26CU-3 diesel-electric locomotives were to be rebuilt from Class ,  and  locomotives. The project commenced in 2005, using suitable frames from wrecked locomotives. Rebuilding was done at the Transwerk shops in Bloemfontein between 2006 and 2008.

It was intended to produce one hundred Class  locomotives but in spite of the technical success of the project, rebuilding was halted after completing the first five locomotives due to higher than anticipated cost. It was decided, instead of rebuilding old locomotives, to continue the program by building fifty new Class  locomotives from imported and locally produced components.

Traction motor upgrade
In 2010, an upgrading project commenced at the Koedoespoort Transnet Rail Engineering shops to upgrade Class  locomotives by, amongst other modifications, replacing the GM-EMD D29B with GM-EMD D31 traction motors, thereby improving their performance to the standard of the Class .

Locomotives that are known to have undergone this upgrade are annotated "D31 TM" in the "Leased, rebuilt or sold to" column in the table.

Service

South African Railways
In SAR, Spoornet and Transnet Freight Rail (TFR) service, the Class  worked on most mainlines and some unelectrified branch lines in the central, eastern, northern and northeastern parts of South Africa.

National Railways of Zimbabwe
From at least 1988 until at least 1992, the National Railways of Zimbabwe (NRZ) hired type GT26MC Class  locomotives from the SAR and later Spoornet. Locomotives which were observed to be working on the NRZ between April 1988 and September 1992 are annotated "NRZ" in the "Leased, rebuilt or sold to" column in the.

NLPI Ltd.
NLPI Limited, abbreviated from New Limpopo Projects Investments, a Mauritius-registered company, specialises in private sector investments by using the build-operate-transfer (BOT) concept. It had three connected railway operations in Zimbabwe and Zambia which formed a rail link between South Africa and the Democratic Republic of Congo.
 The Beitbridge Bulawayo Railway (BBR), commissioned on 1 September 1999, operates the Beit Bridge to Bulawayo line in Zimbabwe.
 Since February 2004, NLPI Logistics (NLL or LOG) operates between Bulawayo and Victoria Falls on the Zimbabwe-Zambia border.
 Since February 2003, the Railway Systems of Zambia (RSZ) operated on the former Zambian Railways (ZR) from Victoria Falls to Sakania in the Congo.

These locomotives were sometimes marked or branded as either BBR or LOG or both, but their status, whether leased or loaned, was unclear since they were still on the TFR roster and still often worked in South Africa as well.

Class  locomotives which served with NLPI include the locomotives annotated "NLPI" in the "Leased, rebuilt or sold to" column in the table.

Zambia Railways, the state-owned holding company, resumed control of the Zambian national rail network on 11 September 2012. This followed the Zambian government's decision to revoke the operating concession awarded to RSZ after Finance Minister Alexander Chikwanda claimed that RSZ had "blatantly disregarded the provisions of the agreement" and had been "acting in a manner prejudicial to the interests of Zambians”.

Sheltam
One of the Class  locomotives, no. , was sold to Sheltam, a locomotive hire and repair company based at the Douglas Colliery near Witbank in Mpumalanga which undertakes complete operating contracts and maintenance contracts. By the turn of the millennium, Sheltam locomotives were operating at Randfontein Estates Gold Mine in Gauteng, in Mpumalanga at Douglas and Vandyksdrift Collieries and at SAPPI, Ngodwana. They also operated on Spoornet's Newcastle-Utrecht branch in KwaZulu-Natal and on Kei Rail in the Eastern Cape. Outside South Africa, they operated on the BBR, NLL and RSZ lines through Zimbabwe and Zambia and in the Democratic Republic of the Congo.

Chemin de Fer Congo-Ocean
Six Class  locomotives were leased to the Congolese railway, the Chemin de Fer Congo-Ocean (CFCO), where they were renumbered in the range from CC801 to CC806.

Camrail
Six more locomotives which were at one time erroneously believed to have also gone to CFCO in the Congo, are now believed to have gone to Camrail in the Republic of Cameroon in about 2002, where they were renumbered in the range from CC2601 to CC2606. The order of their renumbering is not known.

Ferrovia Centro Atlântico
While they were initially part of Spoornet Traction's leasing scheme, they were later renumbered onto the FCA roster in the number range from 8226 to 8230.

Ferrovia Sul Atlântico
Ten Class  locomotives went to Ferrovia Sul Atlântico (FSA) at Curitiba in Brazil, where they also run on Metre gauge. While they were also initially part of Spoornet Traction's leasing scheme, they were later renumbered onto the FSA roster in the number range from 8231 to 8240.

Works numbers
The builder's works numbers of Class  locomotives as well as their known disposal and deployment are listed in the table.

Liveries
The Class 34-600 were all delivered in the SAR Gulf Red livery with signal red buffer beams, yellow side stripes on the long hood sides and a yellow V on each end. In the 1990s many of the Class 34-600 units began to be repainted in the Spoornet orange livery with a yellow and blue chevron pattern on the buffer beams. Some later received the Spoornet Traction maroon livery. After 2008 in the Transnet Freight Rail (TFR) era, some were repainted in the TFR red, green and yellow livery.

Illustration
Depicted below is no.  in Spoornet's Blue Train livery, incorrectly numbered as a Class  on the cabside. The error was corrected later. Other liveries which were applied to Class  locomotives are also illustrated.

References

3390
C-C locomotives
Co′Co′ locomotives
Co+Co locomotives
Electro-Motive Division locomotives
GMSA locomotives
Cape gauge railway locomotives
Railway locomotives introduced in 1974
1974 in South Africa